Colonel Poulett George Henry Somerset CB (19 June 1822 – 7 September 1875) was a British soldier and Conservative Party politician.

Biography
Somerset was the eldest son of Lord Charles Somerset by his second wife, Lady Mary Poulett, Somerset was educated at Eton and the Royal Military College, Sandhurst.

He was commissioned into the Coldstream Guards in 1839.

On 15 April 1847, he married Barbara Augusta Norah Mytton (d. 4 June 1870), the daughter of John Mytton, by whom he had two sons and a daughter:
Cecily Mary Caroline Somerset (20 November 1852 – 30 December 1862)
Vere Francis John Somerset (20 December 1854 – 10 October 1909), married Annette Katherine Hill and had issue
Henry Charles FitzRoy Somerset (23 August 1860 – 28 July 1925), married and had issue

Somerset served as an aide-de-camp to his uncle, Lord Raglan, during the Crimean War. He fought at the Alma, Balaclava, and Inkermann. At Inkermann, his horse was killed under him by a shell. He served at the Siege of Sevastopol and was made a CB for his Crimean services in 1855, as well as a Knight of the Order of the Medjidie, 4th Class.

In 1859, he was returned as Member of Parliament (MP) for Monmouthshire after his first cousin Edward Arthur Somerset resigned. He held the seat until 1871, when he became Steward of the Chiltern Hundreds.

He married Emily Moore on 10 September 1870, by whom he had one daughter:
Cecily Emily Poulett Somerset (1871 – 19 June 1951), married Capt. William Francis Annesley Wallace on 7 April 1896

He died in 1875 and was buried in the nave of Bristol Cathedral.

References 

 Obituary, The Annual Register

1822 births
1875 deaths
People educated at Eton College
Coldstream Guards officers
Companions of the Order of the Bath
Deputy Lieutenants of Monmouthshire
Graduates of the Royal Military College, Sandhurst
Poulett Somerset
Conservative Party (UK) MPs for Welsh constituencies
UK MPs 1859–1865
UK MPs 1865–1868
UK MPs 1868–1874